Ayinla may refer to:

 Ayinla (film), 2021 Nigerian musical biopic

People with the given name
 Ayinla Kollington (born 1953), Nigerian musician
 Ayinla Omowura (1933–1980), Nigerian Apala musician

People with the surname
 Bolaji Ayinla (born 1960), Nigerian politician
 Fatai Ayinla (1939–2016), Nigerian amateur boxer